Van den Spiegel, Van de Spiegel or Van der Spiegel is a surname. Literally meaning "from the mirror", it is thought to usually refer to the home of a mirror maker. Notable people with the surname include:

Adriaan van den Spiegel (1578–1625), Flemish physician active in Italy
Bella van der Spiegel-Hage (born 1948), Dutch racing cyclist
Laurens Pieter van de Spiegel (1736–1800), Dutch Grand Pensionary of Zeeland and Holland
Tomas Van Den Spiegel (born 1978), Belgian basketball player

References

Dutch-language surnames
Surnames of Dutch origin